Kaliště is a municipality and village in Jihlava District in the Vysočina Region of the Czech Republic. It has about 200 inhabitants.

Administrative parts
The village of Býkovec is an administrative part of Kaliště.

References

Villages in Jihlava District